Rhopilema esculentum, the flame jellyfish, is a species of jellyfish native to the warm temperate waters of the Pacific Ocean. It is a popular seafood in southeastern Asia. In the 1980s, research was undertaken in China into its aquaculture, and it is now bred in ponds in that country before being released into the sea to grow to a mature size suitable for the fishery.

Description
Like other members of the order Rhizostomae, the medusa stage of Rhopilema esculentum has no tentacles at the margin of the bell. Instead, underneath the bell it has eight highly branched oral arms, fused at the base and with numerous secondary mouth openings. The bell is rigid, tough and thick with a smooth surface. It is usually suffused with red.

Distribution and habitat
Rhopilema esculentum is found in western Japan, the Bohai Sea, the Yellow Sea, the East China Sea and the North Malayan Sea. It drifts with the currents and is found near the surface in calm weather. It is swept inshore by the rising tide and drifts back out as the tide falls.

Aquaculture and fishery
They grow rapidly and permits are issued allowing fishing some two months later, the optimum fishing period being around mid-August. The fishing grounds are shallow semi-enclosed locations with large tidal flows, freshwater inflows and abundant food.

Use as food
This jellyfish is a popular item of food in China and other southern and eastern Asian countries. It can be eaten raw as a salad and has a crisp texture. Cooking jellyfish requires skill because it shrinks at temperatures above . It is normally preserved by treatment with solutions of alum and salt. The excess salt needs to be removed before cooking. Various jellyfish foods are available on the Chinese market including artificial jellyfish products made largely from sodium alginate.

Medicinal uses
Traditional Chinese medicine advocates the consumption of this jellyfish to treat arthritis, high blood pressure, asthma, burns, ulcers and other ailments; however, further research is needed to verify these claims. Protein isolated from R. esculentum has been shown to have antioxidant and insecticidal properties. Proteomic Analysis revealed that the R. esculentum venom consist of a high variety of putative toxins, including ShKT domain- and Kunitz domain- containing proteins which are potential therapeutic compounds.

See also
 Jellyfish as food

References

Rhizostomatidae
Animals described in 1891
Cnidarians of the Pacific Ocean